Paphiopedilum victoria-mariae is a species of orchid endemic to western Sumatra (Bukittinggi).

victoria-mariae
Plants described in 1896